Kue kembang goyang or kuih loyang is an Indonesian cuisine and Malaysian cuisine flower-shaped traditional snack (kuih), associated with Betawi cuisine and Malay cuisine.

Etymology
If it is translated into English, the word kembang goyang means a shaking flower (kembang). Kue kembang goyang is made of rice flour which is mixed with eggs, sugar, a pinch of salt, and coconut milk. The dough can be fried after heating the oil and the kembang goyang mold. After the oil and kembang goyang mold get hot, the mold can be put into the dough and then put into the hot oil again while shaking a mold until the dough get unattached.

See also 

 Indonesian cuisine
 Malaysian cuisine

References

Malay cuisine
Malaysian cuisine
Indonesian snack foods